Les Liaisons dangereuses (English title: Dangerous Liaisons) is a 2003 French television mini-series directed by Josée Dayan starring Catherine Deneuve, Rupert Everett, Nastassja Kinski and Leelee Sobieski.  It is based on the classic 1782 novel Les Liaisons dangereuses by Pierre Choderlos de Laclos.

Plot
An updated adaptation of Choderlos de Laclos' classic 18th Century tale of seduction, betrayal and revenge set in the modern 1960s world of Parisian high society. The beautiful Madame de Merteuil (Catherine Deneuve) seeks vengeance against her ex-lover Gercourt (Andrzej Zulawski) when he becomes engaged to her young goddaughter, Cécile (Leelee Sobieski). Merteuil turns to her ex-lover/partner-in-crime, Valmont (Rupert Everett), famous for his reputation as a Don Juan, to seduce Cécile and emotionally destroy her. While on his mission, Valmont gets sidetracked when he goes to visit his aunt and falls for Madame Tourvel (Nastassja Kinski), a virtuous, married woman who knows of his womanizing ways, but that only makes the challenge more exciting to Valmont. Together, Madame de Merteuil and Valmont make a dangerous team and they will stop at nothing when it comes to matters of the heart.

Cast
 Catherine Deneuve as Marquise Isabelle de Merteuil
 Rupert Everett as Vicomte Sébastien de Valmont
 Nastassja Kinski as Madame Marie de Tourvel
 Danielle Darrieux as Madame de Rosemonde
 Leelee Sobieski as Cécile de Volanges
 Andrzej Zulawski as Antoine Gercourt
 Cyrille Thouvenin as Hugo / Ludovic
 Françoise Brion as Madame Volanges
 Tedi Papavrami as Raphaël Danceny
 Dominique Besnehard as The deputy of the foundation
 Didier Flamand as The Director
 Maria Belooussova as La pianiste de la foundation
 Paolo Capisano as Me Plissu

External links 
 
 Les Liaisons dangereuses at Allmovie
 

2000s French television miniseries
Television shows based on French novels
2003 television films
2003 films
Films based on works by Pierre Choderlos de Laclos
Television shows set in France
Works based on Les Liaisons dangereuses
2003 French television series debuts
2003 French television series endings
Films directed by Josée Dayan